Benjamín Lacayo Sacasa (27 June 1893 – 4 April 1959) was the President of Nicaragua from 27 May to 15 August 1947.

He was born in Granada, Nicaragua. Lacayo Sacasa was the president of the lower chamber of National Congress of Nicaragua in 1933 and 1947.

On 26 May 1947, he was installed with the help of former president Anastasio Somoza García, the commander of the army, who had become dissatisfied with his recently elected successor, Leonardo Argüello. Lacayo served as president for three months.

He was a relative of Silvestre Selva, provisional Supreme Director of Nicaragua, Roberto Sacasa, 10th President, and his son Juan Bautista Sacasa, 18th President, as well as a cousin of Roberto Martínez Lacayo, President of Nicaragua from 1 May 1972 to 1 March 1973 and from 1 March 1973 to 1 December 1974, and Arnoldo Alemán, 28th President of Nicaragua.

Benjamin Lacayo Sacasa was the brother of Bertha Lacayo Sacaza, she was married to Lisimaco Lacayo Solorzano and they had two children Chester and Will Lacayo Lacayo.  Will Lacayo Lacayo was the father of  Danilo Lacayo (children Mauricio Lacayo and Danilo Lacayo), Ligia Lacayo (children Karla Vanessa Zuniga Lacayo, Ligia Marcela Zuniga Lacayo and Gianncarlo Ortega), Bertha Lacayo (children Bertha Olivares Lacayo, Karina Olivares Lacayo, Carmen Olivares Lacayo and Ivan Olivares Lacayo) and Tania Lacayo (children Tania Melly Huete Lacayo and Afredo Huete Lacayo).

References

1893 births
1959 deaths
Presidents of Nicaragua
Presidents of the Chamber of Deputies (Nicaragua)
Nationalist Liberal Party politicians